Bay Furnace was a town in Alger County, Michigan west of Munising, Michigan.  It was established in 1869 around a blast furnace run by the Bay Furnace Company and used to make iron ore into pig iron.  The furnace was destroyed by a fire in 1877.

References

Sources

Populated places established in 1869
Former municipalities in Michigan
1869 establishments in Michigan